Saif Yousef Mohamed Moosa Abdulla (Arabic:سيف يوسف محمد موسى عبدالله; born 10 January 1989) is an Emirati footballer. He currently plays as a goalkeeper.

References

External links
 

Emirati footballers
1989 births
Living people
Al Ahli Club (Dubai) players
Shabab Al-Ahli Club players
UAE Pro League players
Association football goalkeepers